The 2018 South American Rugby League Championship will be held in São Paulo, Brazil and is going to be held on the 23rd to the 25th of November 2018. The tournament is the inaugural South American Championship. The teams participating in the tournament are Brazil, Argentina and Colombia. The South American Cup also includes a women's international between the Brazilian women's team and Argentinian women's team and a second division game between Brazil and Argentina, as well as an Under-17's match between Brazil and Argentina.

Fixtures

South American Cup – Men's

South American Silver Cup – Men's

South American Cup – Women's

Under-17's International 
Fixture Source:

Teams

Brazil 
Brazil Men's Squad:

Liniker Farias (São Lourenço), Rogério Simões (Bandeirantes Devils), Warlen Junior (Jacareí), Lucas Drudi (Jacareí), Douglas Parazi (Piratas), Vinícius Hideo (SPAC), Lucas Virias (Paraná), Leandro Caetano (Bandeirantes Devils) Jorge Cabral (Oxford), Gudemberg Silva (Bandeirantes Devils), Gabriel Eduardo (Paraná), Bruno Gil (Bandeirantes Devils), Zachary Grundy (Nambour Crushers); Interchange: Matheus Marinho (Bandeirantes Devils), Danilo Vieira (Templários), Johnny Santos (Portuguesa Futebol Americano), Branco Meneses (Portuguesa Futebol Americano). Rafael Góes (Jacareí), Caio Ozzioli (Bandeirantes Devils), Denes Cardozo (Piratas), Arthur Isaac (São Lourenço)

Brazil Men's B Squad:

Marcos Matioli (Rio de Janeiro), Leandro Pereira (C) (Tatuape), Djalma Dias (Tatuape), Diego Gonsalves (Piratas), Carlos Silva (Sao Lourenco) 6 Liam Piacente (Bandeirantes Devils), Victor Gerheim (Rio de Janeiro), Alexandre Arantes, (Sao Lourenco), Joao Victor, (Sao Lourenco), Diller (Rio de Janeiro Rugby League XIII), Fred Costa, (BH Rugby), Claudio Martins (Rio de Janeiro), Sergio Junior (Rio de Janeiro); Interchange: Joao Paulo da Silva (Rio de Janeiro), Thiago Navarro (Tatuape), Daniel Brito (Rio de Janeiro), Lucas Pires (Athens Itanhaem), Diller Nogueira (Templarios), Samuel Naassom do Nascimento (Bandeirantes Devils), Fernando Mazon (Parana)

Brazil Women's Squad:

Carolina Palazzini (C) (Bandeirantes Devils), Camila Santos (SPAC), Juliana Modaneze (Bandeirantes Devils), Paula Ishibashi (SPAC), Grasiele Santos (Bandeirantes Devils), Aline Mayumi (SPAC), Danielle Missau (Pasteur Athletique Club), Andressa Conreras (Niteroi), Camila Giaj-Levra (Bandeirantes Devils), Brunta Lotufu (Bandeirantes Devils), Schwarleny Schwambach (Bandeirantes Devils), Kathleen Silva (Sao Lourenco); Interchange: Ketlen Oliveira (Sao Lourenco), Maria Graf (Desterro), Karina Araujo (Vitoria), Ana Claudia (Rio de Janeiro), Edna Santini (Sao Jose), Tatiane Fernandes (Lenks), Amanda Snaga (USP)

Source:

Colombia 
Colombia Men's Squad:

1. Nicolas Medina 2. Daniel Vera Girdalo 3. Duvan Barrera 4. Hector Linares 5. Andres Pena 6. Alex Palomeque 7. Juan Camilo Bermudez 8. Steven Bedoya 9. Johan Bastioas 10. Mautricio Patino 11. Diego Vina 12. Sebastian Hernandez 13. Alejandro Munevar 14. Luigui Vanegas 15. Juan David Espinal 16. Alex Estman 17. Luis David Valencia

Source:

Argentina 
Argentina Men's Squad:

Juan Ignacio Canepa, Marcelo Villalba, Emiliano Rodriguez, Ares Martinez, Ariel Cosso, Facundo Lizarzuay, Lucas Escobar, Gaston Barrera, Dario Moyano, Ulises Silva, Nahuel Lajmanovich, Leandro Donato, Sergio Espinola; Interchange: Dylan Moreira, Juan Carlos Blumetti, Ernesto Di Nucci, Leandro Kwiczor, Brian Avejera

Source:

References 

South
Rugby league in South America